Pycnosphaera is a monotypic genus of flowering plants belonging to the family Gentianaceae. The only species is Pycnosphaera buchananii.

Its native range is Tropical Africa to Botswana.

References

Gentianaceae
Gentianaceae genera
Monotypic Gentianales genera
Taxa named by N. E. Brown
Taxa named by John Gilbert Baker